Luis Alfonso Revilla (born November 30, 1989) is a Filipino professional basketball player for the NorthPort Batang Pier of the Philippine Basketball Association (PBA).

College career

Revilla, a San Beda Red Cub stalwart, was recruited by DLSU and suited up for the Green Archers in 2008. In his rookie season, he averaged 3.5 points, 1.7 rebounds, 1.9 assists, and 0.7 steals on 14.3 minutes per game, and was just a backup guard then to JVee Casio and Simon Atkins. His team lost to the Ateneo Blue Eagles in the UAAP Season 71 Finals. By the end of that season he was named a member of the league's All-Rookie team.

In summer of 2009, a few months before the opening of the UAAP's 72nd Season, he was diagnosed to have type 2 diabetes, a condition, which he said, runs in their family. This has prevented him from suiting up for La Salle for two seasons.

After two years, he returned to active competition in Season 74, and would become La Salle's top scorer and even the league's second leading point maker.  He finished the season with averages of 7.7 points, 3.7 assists and a league-leading 1.8 steals per game.

The next year, he would come on strong in Season 75, highlighted by 19 points in a double overtime loss to UST Growling Tigers in the first round, but things would then take a turn for the worse. Against the NU Bulldogs in the first round finale, he would tweak his ankle in a double overtime victory after masterfully orchestrating the offense for the Green Archers down the stretch. He would still finish the eliminations with averages of 8.7 points, 4.6 rebounds and three assists, but he was only able to suit up for nine out of the 14 regular season games as rookie Thomas Torres stepped into his role as the primary point guard.

He would continue his role in Season 76 as an off-the-bench player, serving as a backup to Torres for most of the first round; however, after La Salle almost fell out of the standings with 3-4 win–loss record and with Torres sidelined with an injury, he would regain his starting spot and helped the team sweep the second round, and eventually win their UAAP Championship since 2007.

He elected to forgo his final playing year after he applied for the PBA draft.

Professional career

Revilla was picked 24th overall in the third round by GlobalPort Batang Pier in the 2013 PBA draft.  He joined GlobalPort's fully loaded backcourt of Sol Mercado and fellow draftees RR Garcia and Terrence Romeo, his former rivals from FEU. He would also be reunited with former Ateneo Blue Eagle and high school teammate Nico Salva.

He played a total of just three games with the Batang Pier, averaging 0.7 points, 1.3 rebounds and 0.7 assist in 7.6 minutes during the Philippine Cup. He was released by the team after playing just one conference. He then played for the Cagayan Rising Suns in the PBA D-League, in the hope of earning another call-up to the pro league.

He then joined the tryouts for expansion team Kia Sorento, and won a spot in the team for the upcoming 2014–15 PBA season. He also signed a one-year contract with the team.

In his first game in a Sorento uniform, he posted his career-high 23 points as he led the Sorentos' rally in the third quarter to beat Blackwater Elite in their season debut at the Philippine Arena.

PBA career statistics

As of the end of 2020 season

Season-by-season averages

|-
| align="left" | 
| align="left" | GlobalPort
| 3 || 7.7 || .167 || .000 || .000 || 1.3 || .7 || .0 || .0 || .7
|-
| align="left" | 
| align="left" rowspan="3" | Kia / Mahindra
| 32 || 27.8 || .405 || .241 || .776 || 4.3 || 4.2 || 1.5 || .0 || 9.6
|-
| align="left" | 
| 31 || 28.4 || .408 || .275 || .741 || 3.7 || 4.1 || 1.4 || .0 || 10.6
|-
| align="left" | 
| 30 || 22.8 || .415 || .333 || .778 || 3.1 || 3.7 || .9 || .0 || 6.9
|-
| align="left" | 
| align="left" rowspan="2" | Phoenix
| 32 || 21.4 || .364 || .259 || .548 || 3.1 || 3.9 || 1.5 || .0 || 4.2
|-
| align="left" | 
| 22 || 17.7 || .388 || .278 || .650 || 2.7 || 2.5 || .8 || .0 || 4.5
|-
| align="left" | 
| align="left" | NorthPort
| 11 || 13.1 || .333 || .235 || .000 || 1.9 || 1.4 || .4 || .0 || 2.2
|-class=sortbottom
| align="center" colspan=2 | Career
| 161 || 23.0 || .397 || .268 || .721 || 3.3 || 3.5 || 1.2 || .0 || 6.8

Personal life
Revilla is married to volleyball player Denden Lazaro.

References

1989 births
Living people
Basketball players from Negros Occidental
Terrafirma Dyip players
Filipino men's basketball players
NorthPort Batang Pier players
Philippine Basketball Association All-Stars
Phoenix Super LPG Fuel Masters players
Point guards
Sportspeople from Bacolod
De La Salle Green Archers basketball players
Barangay Ginebra San Miguel draft picks
Filipino men's 3x3 basketball players
PBA 3x3 players